Hoffmann v South African Airways is an important case, heard by the Constitutional Court, in South African labour and constitutional law.

Hoffmann argued that he had been unfairly discriminated against on the ground of disability, due to his being HIV positive. The Constitutional Court held that HIV was not a "disability," but found nonetheless that discrimination on this basis would constitute an infringement of dignity, as it was discrimination based on a person's medical health. Discrimination on the basis of HIV status, as part of discrimination on the basis of illness, was held to be analogous to the grounds of unfair discrimination listed in the Constitution, and was found, therefore, to be unfair.

The case was heard on 18 August 2000 and decided on 28 September 2000.

References 

Constitutional Court of South Africa cases
South African labour case law
2000 in South African law
2000 in case law